Clarence Eugene Sasser (born September 12, 1947) is a former United States Army soldier and a recipient of the United States military's highest decoration for valor, the Medal of Honor, for his actions in the Vietnam War.

Early life and Vietnam War
Born in Chenango, Texas, Sasser briefly attended the University of Houston as a chemistry major but was forced to drop out due to lack of funds. He was drafted into the United States Army after giving up his college deferment and served as a combat medic during the Vietnam War. Sasser's Vietnam War tour lasted just 51 days. He received the Medal of Honor from President Richard Nixon in 1969 for his actions on January 10, 1968, in Dinh Tuong Province, South Vietnam. A member of Headquarters and Headquarters Company, 3rd Battalion, 60th Infantry Regiment, 9th Infantry Division, he was a private first class attached to the 3rd Battalion's Company A when he earned the medal and was later promoted to specialist five.

Civilian life
When his military commitment was finished, Sasser enrolled at Texas A&M University as a chemistry student. He then worked at an oil refinery for more than five years before being employed by the United States Department of Veterans Affairs.

A statue depicting Sasser in the war was created in 2010 and will be placed in front of the Brazoria County Courthouse.

Medal of Honor

Official citation:

See also

List of Medal of Honor recipients for the Vietnam War
List of African-American Medal of Honor recipients

References

External links

1947 births
African-American United States Army personnel
United States Army Medal of Honor recipients
Living people
United States Army soldiers
Combat medics
People from Brazoria County, Texas
United States Army personnel of the Vietnam War
Vietnam War recipients of the Medal of Honor
21st-century African-American people
African Americans in the Vietnam War
20th-century African-American people